The Doc Salbe PGA European Challenge was a golf tournament on the Challenge Tour. It was only held once, in 2007, and played over the New Course at the Golf & Vitalpark Bad Waldsee in Bad Waldsee, Upper Swabia, Germany. The event was won by Scotland's Peter Whiteford.

Winners

External links
Official coverage on the Challenge Tour's official site

Former Challenge Tour events
Golf tournaments in Germany